Mai Kuraki Single Collection: Chance for You is the fifth compilation album and first single collection by Japanese singer-songwriter Mai Kuraki. It was released on 25 December 2019 by Northern Music, in commemoration of Kuraki's 20th anniversary since her debut. The album features all the singles and some promotional singles Kuraki has released, since her debut "Love, Day After Tomorrow" (2000) to "Kimi to Koi no Mama de Owarenai Itsumo Yume no Mama ja Irarenai"/"Barairo no Jinsei" (2019).

Release and promotion

Meet and greet tour
In support of the album, Kuraki embarked on the meet and greet tour.

Charting performance
In Japan, the album debuted at number six on the Oricon Daily Albums Chart, becoming her weakest debut since One Life (2008). On the following day, it climbed to number three, selling 4,378 physical copies in its second day. Mai Kuraki Single Collection: Chance for You debuted at number six on the Oricon Weekly Albums Chart, selling 18,171 physical copies in its first week. In the following week, the album fell from number six to fifteen, with the sales of 3,023 copies.

Track listing

Credits and personnel
Technical
Ryan Smith - mastering 
Ted Jensen - mastering 
Chris Gehringer - mastering 
Randy Merrill - mastering 
Joe LaPorta - mastering 

Design
 Shōmei Yoh - cover art

Charts

Daily charts

Weekly charts

Release history

References

External links
 Mai Kuraki official website

Mai Kuraki albums
2019 compilation albums
Japanese-language compilation albums
Being Inc. compilation albums
Albums produced by Daiko Nagato